James Harrison Oliver (1857 – April 6, 1928) was a Rear Admiral and member of the Naval Board of Strategy during World War I. He was also the first military Governor of the United States Virgin Islands from 1917 to 1919. He was often referred to as J. H. Oliver.

Biography
Oliver was born in Houston County, Georgia. He graduated from Washington and Lee University in 1872 and the United States Naval Academy in 1877. In 1893, he moved to Shirley Plantation in Charles City, Virginia and married; this would remain his home, while not serving in the Navy, for the remainder of his life.

Resignation from the Navy
He was arrested and to be court-martialed, but the trial was delayed for more than a year while he remained in command of his ship—despite being technically under arrest. (In Navy tradition, he had also been stripped of his sword—a humiliation.) He was subsequently acquitted "with honor". At the ceremony officially returning his sword to him, he broke the sword and threw it into the ocean and immediately resigned from the Navy. While retired, he was briefly appointed as the Inspector of the Fourteenth Lighthouse District in Cincinnati, Ohio. In 1906, President Theodore Roosevelt formally reinstated his commission, reportedly saying (with respect to his resignation) "I'd have done the same thing myself." When reinstated, he was simultaneously promoted to Commander.

He was promoted to Captain in 1910 and Rear Admiral in 1916, just prior to the United States entrance into World War I. He was subsequently elevated to Chief of Naval Intelligence by 1917.

Governor of the U.S. Virgin Islands
On March 28, 1917, he was appointed as Governor of the United States Virgin Islands by President Woodrow Wilson. (Edwin Taylor Pollock was made acting-Governor until his arrival.) He remained as Governor for two years, until 1919. He was awarded Navy Cross for his service as a governor. 

Oliver was quickly granted a loan of $200,000 ($3.4 million, adjusted for inflation) by the government of the United States for expenses relating to the occupation, including the building of fortifications on the island and the stationing of troops. Being disappointed with the quality of native educators, he also requested that additional instructors be sent from the mainland.

From 1919 until the end of the war, Oliver served on the Naval Board of Strategy. Oliver retired from the Navy in January 1921. He died of heart disease in 1928 at his home in Virginia.

See also

References
  (Announcing his retirement / resignation.)
  (Appointment as inspector, listed as retired.)
  (Appointment as Commander.)

External links

United States Navy personnel of World War I
1857 births
1928 deaths
People from Houston County, Georgia
Governors of the United States Virgin Islands
United States Navy admirals
Directors of the Office of Naval Intelligence